The Lent Bumps 2018 was a series of rowing races at Cambridge University from Tuesday 27 February 2018 to Saturday 3 March 2018.  The event was run as a bumps race and was the 131st set of races in the series of Lent Bumps which have been held annually in late February or early March since 1887. See Lent Bumps for the format of the races.

Due to adverse weather conditions caused by the so-called Beast from the East, racing had to be cancelled for some of the Wednesday and all of the Thursday.  This was first time that racing had had to be cancelled since 2002, when the first day of racing was called off due to strong winds.  Racing had also been cancelled in 2001, when the foot-and-mouth outbreak forced the closure of the towpath, and this was the first time that a cancellation was caused by ice since the Big Freeze of 1963.  Although there was no ice on the river, compacted snow and ice had rendered the towpath extremely slippery, posing a danger to the umpires that cycle alongside the races to ensure safety.  After some narrowly avoided injuries, racing was called off shortly before the M3 division on the Wednesday, and all racing was cancelled on the Thursday, followed by the cancellation of the W3 and M3 divisions on the Friday.

In response to the inability of either CUCBC (the body in charge of the organisation of the Bumps), the Conservators of the Cam or Cambridgeshire County Council to grit the towpath, a large-scale student effort was undertaken on the Thursday evening and the Friday morning to prepare the towpath for safe racing on the Friday.  Over 150 kg (23 st) of salt was deployed by several dozen students from a range of clubs, and after a CUCBC inspection of the towpath on the Friday morning,  the W2, M2, W1 and M1 divisions on the Friday and all racing on the final day was deemed safe to go ahead.

Head of the River crews
  rowed over in both of their races to retain the headship they won in 2017.

  rowed over in both of their races to retain the headship they won in 2016.

Highest 2nd VIIIs
  rowed over three times, retaining their status as the highest placed men's second VIII at 4th position in the second division.

  rowed over three times to retain their position as the highest placed women's second VIII at 5th position in the second division.

Links to races in other years

Bumps Charts

Below are the bumps charts for all 4 men's and all 4 women's divisions, with the men's event on the left and women's event on the right. The bumps chart shows the progress of every crew over all four days of the racing. To follow the progress of any particular crew, find the crew's name on the left side of the chart and follow the line to the end-of-the-week finishing position on the right of the chart.

This chart may not be displayed correctly if you are using a large font size on your browser. A simple way to check is to see that the first horizontal bold line, marking the boundary between divisions, lies between positions 17 and 18.

References 

2018 in rowing
Lent Bumps results
2018 in English sport